"Superstar" is a song by Danish pop duo Toy-Box, it was featured in their album Toy Ride. It was released on July 30, 2001. All CD singles were manufactured in Germany and distributed by Edel Records before being discontinued some time in 2002.

Track listings

iTunes digital download single 
 Superstar (Original Radio Edit)- 3:07
 Superstar (Larz Crimee Remix) [Radio Version]- 3:58

CD maxi single 
 Superstar (Original Radio Edit)- 3:07 Produced by HONEYCUTT
 Superstar (Larz Crimee Remix) [Radio Version]- 3:58 Produced by Bertelsen / Sidelmann at Bim Bam Studios
 Superstar (P&A's Club Mix)- 5:09 Produced by PANMAN & ACE 45
 Superstar (Powers Remix!)- 4:34 Produced by Adam Powers & GOAPAWERS!
 Superstar (Larz Crimee Remix)- 4:51  Produced by Bertelsen / Sidelmann at Bim Bam Studios

Charts

References 
 Toy-Box official website
 "Superstar" - single Discogs.com Release Page

2000 songs
2001 singles
Toy-Box songs
Edel AG singles
Electronic songs
House music songs
Mega Records singles